The Pine Hills are a low mountain range of the Peninsular Ranges, in central San Diego County, California.

References 

Mountain ranges of San Diego County, California
Peninsular Ranges
Hills of California
East County (San Diego County)
Mountain ranges of Southern California